The 2009 National Club Baseball Association (NCBA) Division I World Series was played at City of Palms Park in Fort Myers, FL from May 22 to May 28. The ninth tournament's champion was Colorado State University. This was Colorado State's fifth title in the last six years and second in a row. The Most Valuable Player was Bobby Moller of Colorado State University.

Format
The format is similar to the NCAA College World Series in that eight teams participate in two four-team double elimination brackets with the only difference being that in the NCBA, there is only one game that decides the national championship rather than a best-of-3 like the NCAA.

Participants

Results

Bracket

Game Results

Championship Game

See also
2009 NCBA Division II World Series

References

2009 in baseball
Baseball competitions in Fort Myers, Florida
National Club Baseball Association
NCBA Division I World Series